Natural Bridge Station is an unincorporated community in Rockbridge County, Virginia, United States, named for both its proximity to Natural Bridge and formerly having a train depot along the Norfolk & Western rail line.

Natural Bridge Station is made up mostly of the southeastern corner of Rockbridge County encompassing all of the community of Arnolds Valley (named for the area's first settler, Stephen Arnold) and partially covering several other communities, with its southeastern border running along the Blue Ridge Parkway. Natural Bridge Station has a post office with ZIP code 24579. The population as of 2020 was 1,540.

Communities
There are several small neighborhoods in Natural Bridge Station including:

 Buck Hill
 Cameron Street
 Clark Town
 Flint Town
 Forest Oaks
 Gilmore's Mill
 Greenlee (Bank Hill/Lloyd Tolley/Trackside/Wert Faulkner)
 Stoner Hollow
as well as the entirety of the Arnolds Valley community which includes:
 Back Run (Colen Hollow/Drummond Hill/Shop Hill)
 Cave Mountain
 Cedar Bottom (Johnson's Mobile Home Park/Tolley Hill)
 Elk Creek
 Glenwood
 Hopper Creek
 James River
 Manor View
 Ore Bank
 Petites Gap
 Tomlin's Mobile Home Park

Government
Natural Bridge Station is governed within the Natural Bridge District of the Rockbridge County Board of Supervisors, the 24th district of the Virginia House of Delegates, the 25th district of the Virginia Senate, and Virginia's 6th congressional district of the United States House of Representatives. 

Local law enforcement for Natural Bridge Station is administered by the Rockbridge County Sheriff's Department located in Lexington. Some areas of Natural Bridge Station along the Blue Ridge Parkway are patrolled by the National Park Service. Natural Bridge Station is part of the Glenwood-Pedlar Ranger District. The area's local Ranger Station is located on Ranger Lane just off Wert Faulkner Hwy.

Schools
Natural Bridge Elementary School is located within the "downtown" zone of the community and serves most of southern Rockbridge County. The community's middle and high school students are bussed to Maury River Middle School and Rockbridge County High School in Lexington. The Bridge Christian Academy is a private school within the area.

The Stonebridge Community Center and the Stonebridge Community Church now occupy the main building and surrounding facilities that were once Natural Bridge High School, which closed after the graduation of its Class of 1990. The main building was sold by Sayre Enterprises to Virginia Tech in 2020.

Business and infrastructure
The main business corridor in Natural Bridge Station is located within the "downtown" zone along Wert Faulkner Highway between Sherwood Lane and Virginia Manor Lane. There are several factories in the area including:

 Base X
 Byers
 Des Champs
 EDM
 FEI
 Heatex America
Some other businesses (corporate, family, small, private or otherwise) in the area include:
 AMS Trucking
 B&D Variety Store
 Bank of Botetourt
 Bear & Unicorn Media
 C&S Disposal
Campbell and Sons Lawn Service
Cooper's Stump Grinding, Inc.
 Doggy Stylez Dog Grooming
 Double L Landscaping
 Dreamson Enterprises, Inc.
 FrontLine WoodWorks
 Jellystone Park at Natural Bridge
Nailogic
Natural Bridge Animal Hospital
 Natural Bridge Country Store & Café
 Natural Bridge General Store & NattyB Cafe
 Natural Bridge Heating & Air
 Natural Bridge Station Glass & Gifts
 Natural Bridge Station Recycling Center
 Pioneer Plumbing
 R & S Storage
 Raynal Studios, Inc.
 Seaman & Sons Roofing
 Shayan Electronics
 Thunder BRidge Campground, LLC. (formerly Natural Bridge Juvenile Correctional Facility)"
 Tpee's, LLC General Store & Deli (formerly Arnolds Valley Trading Post)"
Tri-County Autoglass
Villa Views
Virginia Mountain Mortgage
 Vivek Pan Shop
 Wilderness Canoe Company & Campground

Religion

Natural Bridge Station's religious centers and places of various worship include:

 Arnolds Valley Baptist Church
 Beth Horon United Methodist Church
 Faith Baptist Church
 First Baptist Church
 Glenwood Humble Beginnings Church
 Natural Bridge Christian Fellowship
 Stonebridge Community Church

Attractions

Within Natural Bridge Station there are several tourist attractions including:

 Balcony Falls Trailhead
 Cave Mountain Lake Recreation Area & Family Camp
 Devil's Marble Yard
 Elk Cliff(Private, permission required for access)
 Elk Creek Delta(Private, permission required for access)
 Elk Creek's East Fork
 Four Way Trail Crossroads
 Glenwood Furnace Historic Landmark
 Glenwood Horse Trail
 Gunter Ridge Trailhead
 Hellgate Trailhead
 Hickory Stand
 Hopper Creek Group Campground
 Jellystone Park at Natural Bridge
 Locher Tract
 Parker's Gap Mountain Trail
 Sawmill Hollow Swamp
 Smith Tract Campground
 Straw Pond (Arnolds Valley Pool)
 Sulphur Spring Hollow
 Tank Hollow
Thunder BRidge Campground 
 Wildcat Mountain Trail
Wilderness Canoe Company & Campground

The area also has many public access points to the following:

 Appalachian Trail
 Blue Ridge Parkway
 Hoop Pole Gap
 Hopper Ridge
 James River Face Wilderness
 James River Gorge
 Petite's Gap Trail
 Snakeden Ridge
 Thunder Ridge North Face Wilderness
 Thunder Ridge Trail

As well as fishing access, swimming access, and boat/canoe/innertube launch/exit sites along the James River and fishing & swimming access along Elk Creek's East Fork(along Petite's Gap Rd).

The area's waterways include:

Back Run Stream
 Belfast Creek
 Big Hellgate Creek
 Cave Mountain Lake
 Cedar Creek, East End
 Elk Creek
 Hopper Creek
 Hunting Spring
 James River
 Little Hellgate Creek
 Manor View Lake(Private, permission required for access)
 Marble Spring
 Sawmill Branch
 Sawmill Hollow Swamp
 Sulphur Spring

Media

The News Gazette in Lexington, Virginia covers newspaper stories for this area. The Arnolds Valley Community Column, which covers the entire Natural Bridge Station area, published in The News-Gazette is written by local writer/photographer Karyn B. Gardner (published works include: JOURNEY: A Memoir in Photos, Beautiful Things That Caught My Eye). Local published poet, Martha Watkins, who's now deceased, started the column. The Rockbridge Advocate is another media print source for the area.

Local television stations, WDBJ7 (local reporter Bruce Young), WSLS10, and WSET13 (all three covering the greater Roanoke/Lynchburg area) cover the Natural Bridge Station community, as well as a weekly broadcast on local government access channels from Washington and Lee University journalism students called The Rockbridge Report.

Local radio coverage for this area is provided by Classic 96.7 3WZ and WREL AM 1450 in Lexington, Virginia.

Online media coverage for the area is provided by Rockbridge Forum, and EyeOnVirginia.

References

Unincorporated communities in Rockbridge County, Virginia
Unincorporated communities in Virginia
Populated places on the James River (Virginia)